In atomic physics, Hund's rules refers to a set of rules that German physicist Friedrich Hund formulated around 1927, which are used to determine the term symbol that corresponds to the ground state of a multi-electron atom. The first rule is especially important in chemistry, where it is often referred to simply as Hund's Rule.

The three rules are:
 For a given electron configuration, the term with maximum multiplicity has the lowest energy. The multiplicity is also equal to the number of unpaired electrons plus one. Therefore, the term with lowest energy is also the term with maximum  and maximum number of unpaired electrons.
 For a given multiplicity, the term with the largest value of the total orbital angular momentum quantum number  has the lowest energy.
 For a given term, in an atom with outermost subshell half-filled or less, the level with the lowest value of the total angular momentum quantum number  (for the operator ) lies lowest in energy. If the outermost shell is more than half-filled, the level with the highest value of  is lowest in energy.

These rules specify in a simple way how usual energy interactions determine which term includes the ground state. The rules assume that the repulsion between the outer electrons is much greater than the spin–orbit interaction, which is in turn stronger than any other remaining interactions.  This is referred to as the LS coupling regime.

Full shells and subshells do not contribute to the quantum numbers for total , the total spin angular momentum and for , the total orbital angular momentum. It can be shown that for full orbitals and suborbitals both the residual electrostatic energy (repulsion between electrons) and the spin–orbit interaction can only shift all the energy levels together.  Thus when determining the ordering of energy levels in general only the outer valence electrons must be considered.

Rule 1

Due to the Pauli exclusion principle, two electrons cannot share the same set of quantum numbers within the same system;  therefore, there is room for only two electrons in each spatial orbital.  One of these electrons must have, (for some chosen direction z) ms = , and the other must have ms = −.  Hund's first rule states that the lowest energy atomic state is the one that maximizes the total spin quantum number for the electrons in the open subshell. The orbitals of the subshell are each occupied singly with electrons of parallel spin before double occupation occurs. (This is occasionally called the "bus seat rule" since it is analogous to the behaviour of bus passengers who tend to occupy all double seats singly before double occupation occurs.)

Two different physical explanations have been given for the increased stability of high multiplicity states. In the early days of quantum mechanics, it was proposed that electrons in different orbitals are further apart, so that electron–electron repulsion energy is reduced. However, accurate quantum-mechanical calculations (starting in the 1970s) have shown that the reason is that the electrons in singly occupied orbitals are less effectively screened or shielded from the nucleus, so that such orbitals contract and electron–nucleus attraction energy becomes greater in magnitude (or decreases algebraically).

Example

As an example, consider the ground state of silicon. We need to consider only the outer 3p2 electrons, for which it can be shown (see term symbols) that the possible terms allowed by the Pauli exclusion principle are 1D , 3P , and 1S. Hund's first rule now states that the ground state term is 3P (triplet P), which has S = 1. The superscript 3 is the value of the multiplicity = 2S + 1 = 3. The diagram shows the state of this term with ML = 1 and MS = 1.

Rule 2
This rule deals with reducing the repulsion between electrons.  It can be understood from the classical picture that if all electrons are orbiting in the same direction (higher orbital angular momentum) they meet less often than if some of them orbit in opposite directions. In the latter case the repulsive force increases, which separates electrons. This adds potential energy to them, so their energy level is higher.

Example
For silicon there is only one triplet term, so the second rule is not required. The lightest atom that requires the second rule to determine the ground state term is titanium (Ti,  = 22) with electron configuration . (Here the symbols S, P, D, F, and G indicate that the total orbital angular momentum quantum number has values 0, 1, 2, 3 and 4, respectively, analogous to the nomenclature for naming atomic orbitals.)

We deduce from Hund's first rule that the ground state term is one of the two triplets, and from Hund's second rule that this term is 3F (with ) rather than 3P (with ).

Rule 3
This rule considers the energy shifts due to spin–orbit coupling.

The value of   changes from plus to minus for shells greater than half full.

Examples
The  lowest energy term of Si consists of three levels, .  With only two of six possible electrons in the shell, it is less than half-full and thus  is the ground state.

For example, in phosphorus the lowest energy state has  for three unpaired electrons in three 3p orbitals.

Excited states

Hund's rules work best for the determination of the ground state of an atom or molecule.

They are also fairly reliable (with occasional failures) for the determination of the lowest state of a given excited electronic configuration. Thus, in the helium atom, Hund's first rule correctly predicts that the 1s2s triplet state (3S) is lower than the 1s2s singlet (1S). Similarly for organic molecules, the same rule predicts that the first triplet state (denoted by T1 in photochemistry) is lower than the first excited singlet state (S1), which is generally correct.

However Hund's rules should not be used to order states other than the lowest for a given configuration. For example, the titanium atom ground state configuration is ...3d2 for which a naïve application of Hund's rules would suggest the ordering 3F < 3P < 1G < 1D < 1S. In reality, however, 1D lies below 1G.

References

External links
 
 A glossary entry hosted on the web site of the Chemistry Department of Purdue University
 A PhysicsWeb article
 Multiplets in Transition Metal ions in E. Pavarini, E. Koch, F. Anders, and M. Jarrell: Correlated Electrons: From Models to Materials, Jülich 2012, 
 E. Scerri, The Periodic Table, Its Story and Its Significance, 2nd ed. (Oxford University Press, 2020) 

Atomic physics
Quantum chemistry
Spectroscopy
Rules